Gallant Lady is a 1934 American pre-Code drama film directed by Gregory La Cava and written by Sam Mintz. The film stars Ann Harding, Clive Brook, Otto Kruger, Tullio Carminati, Dickie Moore, Janet Beecher and Betty Lawford. The film was released on January 5, 1934, by United Artists.

Plot

Cast 
Ann Harding as Sally Wyndham
Clive Brook as Dan Pritchard
Otto Kruger as Phillip Lawrence
Tullio Carminati as Count Mario Carniri
Dickie Moore as Deedy Lawrence
Janet Beecher as Maria Sherwood
Betty Lawford as Cynthia Haddon 
Scotty Beckett as Deedy - Age 2 (uncredited)

References

External links 
 

1934 films
American black-and-white films
Films directed by Gregory La Cava
Films scored by Alfred Newman
Twentieth Century Pictures films
United Artists films
1934 drama films
American drama films
1930s English-language films
1930s American films